Heterotrimeric G protein, also sometimes referred to as the "large" G proteins (as opposed to the subclass of smaller, monomeric small GTPases) are membrane-associated G proteins that form a heterotrimeric complex. The biggest non-structural difference between heterotrimeric and monomeric G protein is that heterotrimeric proteins bind to their cell-surface receptors, called G protein-coupled receptors, directly. These G proteins are made up of alpha (α), beta (β) and gamma (γ) subunits. The alpha subunit is attached to either a GTP or GDP, which serves as an on-off switch for the activation of G-protein.

When ligands bind a GPCR, the GPCR acquires GEF (guanine nucleotide exchange factor) ability, which activates the G-protein by exchanging the GDP on the alpha subunit to GTP. The binding of GTP to the alpha subunit results in a structural change and its dissociation from the rest of the G-protein. Generally, the alpha subunit binds membrane-bound effector proteins for the downstream signaling cascade, but the beta-gamma complex can carry out this function also. G-proteins are involved in pathways such as the cAMP/PKA pathway, ion channels, MAPK, PI3K.

There are four main families of G proteins: Gi/Go,  Gq, Gs, and G12/13.

Alpha subunits

Reconstitution experiments carried out in the early 1980s showed that purified Gα subunits can directly activate effector enzymes. The GTP form of the α subunit of transducin (Gt) activates the cyclic GMP phosphodiesterase from retinal rod outer segments, and the GTP form of the α subunit of the stimulatory G protein (Gs) activates hormone-sensitive adenylate cyclase. More than one type of G protein co-exist in the same tissue. For example, in adipose tissues, two different G-proteins with interchangeable beta-gamma complexes are used to activate or inhibit adenylyl cyclase. The alpha subunit of a stimulatory G protein activated by receptors for stimulatory hormones could stimulate adenylyl cyclase, which activates cAMP used for downstream signal cascades. While on the other hand, the alpha subunit of an inhibitory G protein activated by receptors of inhibitory hormones could inhibit adenylyl cyclase, which blocks downstream signal cascades.

Gα subunits consist of two domains, the GTPase domain, and the alpha-helical domain.

There exist at least 20 different Gα subunits, which are separated into four main groups. This nomenclature is based on their sequence homologies:

G beta-gamma complex
 
The β and γ subunits are closely bound to one another and are referred to as the G beta-gamma complex. Both beta and gamma subunits have different isoforms, and some combination of isoforms result in dimerization while other combinations do not. For example, beta1 binds both gamma subunits while beta3 binds neither.  Upon activation of the GPCR, the Gβγ complex is released from the Gα subunit after its GDP-GTP exchange.

Function 
The free Gβγ complex can act as a signaling molecule itself, by activating other second messengers or by gating ion channels directly.

For example, the Gβγ complex, when bound to histamine receptors, can activate phospholipase A2. Gβγ complexes bound to muscarinic acetylcholine receptors, on the other hand, directly open G protein-coupled inward rectifying potassium channels (GIRKs). When acetylcholine is the extracellular ligand in the pathway, the heart cell hyperpolarizes normally to decrease heart  muscle contraction. When substances such as muscarine act as ligands, the dangerous amount of hyperpolarization leads to hallucination. Therefore, proper functioning of Gβγ plays a key role in our physiological well-being.  The last function is activating L-type calcium channels, as in H3 receptor pharmacology.

Heterotrimeric G-proteins in Plants 
Heterotrimeric G-protein signaling in plants deviates from the metazoan model at various levels. For example, the presence of extra-Large G alpha, loss of G alpha and Regulator of G-protein signaling (RGS) in many plant lineages. In addition, the G-proteins are not essential for the survival in dicotyledonous plants, while they are essential for the survival of monocotyledonous plants.

References

External links 
 
 

Peripheral membrane proteins
EC 3.6.5